The 1931 Minnesota Golden Gophers football team represented the University of Minnesota in the 1931 college football season. In their second year under head coach Fritz Crisler, the Golden Gophers compiled a 7–3 record, shut out four opponents, and outscored all opponents by a combined score of 191 to 72.

Guard Clarence Munn was selected as the team's Most Valuable Player for the second consecutive year. Munn was also a consensus first-team player on the 1931 College Football All-America Team. Munn also received Chicago Tribune Silver Football, awarded to the most valuable player in the Big Ten Conference.

Two Golden Gophers received first-team honors on the 1931 All-Big Ten Conference football team. Munn and fullback Jack Manders both received first-team honors from the Associated Press (AP) and the United Press (UP).

Total attendance for the season was 115,631, which averaged to 23,126. The season high for attendance was against rival Wisconsin.

Schedule

Roster
 G Clarence Munn

Game summaries

Michigan

On November 21, 1931, Minnesota lost to Michigan by a 6 to 0 score at Michigan Stadium. Michigan's only points came on a 56-yard run by Bill Hewitt in the first quarter.

References

Michigan
Minnesota Golden Gophers football seasons
Minnesota Golden Gophers football